Benares is a Mauritius movie directed and written by Barlen Pyamootoo, and released on 29 March 2006 (France). With the film, Pyamootoo became the first Mauritian filmmaker to use Mauritian Creole in a film.

Plot
Two young men who travelled around Mauritius of which they meet two interesting ladies who had them entertained.

Cast
 Barlen Pyamootoo
 Danielle Dalbert 
 Sandra Faro 
 Davidsen Kamanah 
 Kristeven Mootien 
 Vanessa Li Lun Yuk

References

Mauritian drama films
2006 films